The 2022 UEFA European Under-19 Championship (also known as UEFA Under-19 Euro 2022) was the 19th edition of the UEFA European Under-19 Championship (69th edition if the Under-18 and Junior eras are included), the annual international youth football championship organised by UEFA for the men's under-19 national teams of Europe. Slovakia hosted the tournament between 18 June and 1 July 2022. A total of eight teams played in the tournament, with players born on or after 1 January 2003 eligible to participate.

Same as previous editions held in even-numbered years, the tournament acted as the UEFA qualifiers for the FIFA U-20 World Cup. The top five teams of the tournament qualified for the 2023 FIFA U-20 World Cup in Indonesia as the UEFA representatives.

Spain were the defending champions, having won the last tournament held in 2019, with the 2020 and 2021 editions cancelled due to the COVID-19 pandemic in Europe and the title was not awarded. They were not able to defend the title after failing to qualify for the competition.

Host selection
The timeline of host selection was as follows:
11 January 2019: bidding procedure launched
28 February 2019: deadline to express interest
27 March 2019: Announcement by UEFA that declaration of interest were received from 17 member associations to host one of the UEFA national team youth final tournaments (UEFA European Under-19 Championship, UEFA Women's Under-19 Championship, UEFA European Under-17 Championship, UEFA Women's Under-17 Championship) in 2021 and 2022 (although it was not specified which association were interested in which tournament)
28 June 2019: Submission of bid dossiers
24 September 2019: Selection of successful host associations by the UEFA Executive Committee at its meeting in Ljubljana

For the UEFA European Under-19 Championship final tournaments of 2021 and 2022, Romania and Slovakia were selected as hosts respectively.

Qualification

The UEFA Executive Committee originally decided on 29 May 2019 to test a new qualifying format for the Under-19 Championship in 2022 and 2023. The qualifying competition would have been played in four rounds over a two-year period from autumn 2020 to spring 2022, with teams divided into three leagues, and promotion and relegation between leagues after each round similar to the UEFA Nations League. However, on 17 June 2020, UEFA announced that the introduction of the new format had been postponed to the 2023 edition due to the COVID-19 pandemic in Europe, and qualification for the 2022 edition would use the previous format involving two rounds only.

A total of 54 (out of 55) UEFA nations entered the competition, and with the hosts Slovakia qualifying automatically, the other 53 teams will compete in the qualifying competition, which consisted of two rounds: the Qualifying round, which took place in autumn 2021, and the Elite round, which took place in spring 2022, to determine the remaining seven spots in the final tournament. The draw for the qualifying round was held on 9 December 2020, 10:30 CET (UTC+1), at the UEFA headquarters in Nyon, Switzerland.

Qualified teams
The following teams qualified for the final tournament.

Note: All appearance statistics include only U-19 era (since 2002).

Venues

Match officials
The following officials were appointed for the final tournament:

Referees
 Nathan Verboomen
 Morten Krogh
 Goga Kikacheishvili
 Manfredas Lukjančukas
 Matthew De Gabriele
 António Nobre

Assistant referees
 Mathias Hillaert
 Deniz Sokolov
 Steffen Beck Bramsen
 Turkka Joonas Valjakka
 Davit Gabisonia
 Edgaras Bučinskas
 Luke Portelli
 Pedro Martins

Fourth officials
 Gergő Bogár
 Adam Ladebäck

Squads

Group stage
The final tournament schedule was announced on 28 April 2022.

The group winners and runners-up advanced to the semi-finals and qualify for the 2023 FIFA U-20 World Cup.

Group A

Group B

Knockout stage

Bracket

FIFA U-20 World Cup play-off
Winners qualified for the 2023 FIFA U-20 World Cup.

Semi-finals

Final

Goalscorers

Team of the tournament
The UEFA Technical Observer team announced the team of the tournament.

Qualified teams for FIFA U-20 World Cup
The following five teams from UEFA qualified for the 2023 FIFA U-20 World Cup in Indonesia.

1 Bold indicates champions for that year. Italic indicates hosts for that year.

References

External links

 
2022
Under-19 Championship
2022 Uefa European Under-19 Championship
2021–22 in Slovak football
2022 in youth association football
2023 FIFA U-20 World Cup qualification
UEFA
UEFA
Sports events affected by the 2022 Russian invasion of Ukraine